The Toyota Princess Cup was a WTA Tour affiliated professional women's tennis tournament held annually from 1997-2002. It was played in Tokyo, Japan and was categorized as a Tier II event.

Competitors played their matches on outdoor hard courts. Monica Seles and Serena Williams each won the event twice, with Seles collecting a further two titles in the doubles event. Ai Sugiyama was the only winner from Japan, with her two triumphs coming in the doubles in 1997 and 2000.

Prize money
These were the total prize funds for each tournament.

Results

Singles

Doubles

References
WTA Tour website

 
Hard court tennis tournaments
Defunct tennis tournaments in Japan
WTA Tour
Recurring sporting events established in 1997
Recurring sporting events disestablished in 2002
1997 establishments in Japan
2002 disestablishments in Japan